Jai Narain Prasad Nishad (18 November 1930 – 24 December 2018) was an Indian politician and member of parliament from Muzaffarpur Lok Sabha Constituency in the Indian State of Bihar. He was a Union Minister for State in 1996-1998 and has been a member of Lok Sabha five times and a former member of Rajya Sabha. He was a member of Janata Dal (United) and with the Bharatiya Janata Party. His son, Ajay Nishad is the MP of Muzaffarpur.

Disqualified from parliament
Nishad was a member of BJP when he was disqualified as a member of Rajya Sabha in April 2008 under the Anti-defection Law by the Vice President of India who is also the chairman of Rajya Sabha for switching sides. He was removed as a member of Rajya Sabha.

He changed to five political parties fifteen times but got elected from the same seat five times.

References

|-

|-

1930 births
2018 deaths
Bharatiya Janata Party politicians from Bihar
Rajya Sabha members from Bihar
People from Vaishali district
India MPs 2009–2014
Lok Sabha members from Bihar
Janata Party politicians
Rashtriya Janata Dal politicians
Janata Dal (United) politicians
Janata Dal politicians
India MPs 1996–1997
India MPs 1998–1999
India MPs 1999–2004
Lok Janshakti Party politicians